Píritu may refer to a number of Venezuelan localities:

 Píritu, Anzoátegui, town in the Píritu Municipality, Anzoátegui
 Píritu, Falcón, town in the Píritu Municipality, Falcón, in the state of Falcón
 Píritu, Portuguesa, town in the state of Portuguesa
 Puerto Píritu, town in the state of Anzoátegui
 Píritu Islets, two small islands in Anzoátegui